In the aftermath of 1978 Maharashtra legislative elections, Vasantdada Patil of the Indian National Congress(U) was appointed Chief Minister. A coalition government, it consisted of members from Congress(Urs) and Congress (I), including Deputy Chief Minister Nashikrao Tirpude.

The Patil ministry continued for four months, and was replaced by Sharad Pawar's Indian Congress (Socialist) breakaway faction.

List of ministers
The short served ministry consisted of 13 cabinet ministers, including Patil.

References

Indian National Congress
P
P
Cabinets established in 1978
Cabinets disestablished in 1978